Lucas Bossio (born 6 March 1990) is an Argentine professional footballer who plays as a midfielder for Italian Serie D club Athletic Carpi.

Career
Arsenal de Sarandí were a youth club of Bossio's, leaving the club in August 2012 to sign for Rivadavia. In his eleventh senior appearance, on 4 November, Bossio received his first red card against Alvarado. He featured in thirty-two matches in Torneo Argentino A for Rivadavia, before switching to San Jorge in 2013. Bossio remained in the third tier with San Martín ahead of the 2014 Torneo Federal A. He netted his first senior goal in May 2015 versus San Lorenzo. Primera B Nacional side Chacarita Juniors signed Bossio on 5 January 2016. Seven appearances came, including his bow on 18 March in a Central Córdoba draw.

Bossio dropped back down to Torneo Federal A after agreeing to rejoin San Jorge on 15 August. Five months later, the midfielder moved to Sarmiento where he participated nine times during 2016–17. Bossio spent the subsequent campaign back with San Miguel de Tucumán's San Martín, with them now playing in Primera B Nacional. He appeared ten times as the club won the promotion play-off finals over Sarmiento (J). Fellow second tier team Guillermo Brown completed the signing of Bossio in July 2018. His first match was a home loss against Brown on 26 August. A move to Almagro occurred in July 2019.

After featuring twenty times in all competitions for Almagro, Bossio departed in August 2020 to Greek Football League club Niki Volos. On 28 January 2022, Bossio moved to Italian Serie D club Athletic Carpi.

Career statistics
.

References

External links

1990 births
Living people
Argentine footballers
Argentine expatriate footballers
Sportspeople from Córdoba Province, Argentina
Association football midfielders
Torneo Argentino A players
Torneo Federal A players
Primera Nacional players
Super League Greece 2 players
Serie D players
Rivadavia de Lincoln footballers
San Jorge de Tucumán footballers
San Martín de Tucumán footballers
Chacarita Juniors footballers
Sarmiento de Resistencia footballers
Guillermo Brown footballers
Club Almagro players
Niki Volos F.C. players
Expatriate footballers in Greece
Expatriate footballers in Italy
Argentine expatriate sportspeople in Greece
Argentine expatriate sportspeople in Italy